The Emblem of Arunachal Pradesh is the official seal of the government of the Indian state of Arunachal Pradesh.

Design

The emblem depicts the Sun rising between the peaks of Komdi and Daphabum above a Mithun bison head and is supported by two Hornbills with the crest being formed by the Emblem of India. The mithun bison and hornbill are the official state animals and birds of Arunachal Pradesh and mountains and sunrise allude to the name of the state which translates into "the land of dawn-lit mountains".

Government Banner

The Government of Arunachal Pradesh can be represented by a white banner depicting the emblem of the state.

See also
 National Emblem of India
 List of Indian state emblems

References

External links
 Government of Arunachal Pradesh

Government of Arunachal Pradesh
Arunachal Pradesh